For the Canadian footballer of the same name see Ken Charlton (Canadian football).

Kenneth James Charlton (15 July 1923 – 19 November 2012) was an Australian rugby league footballer who played in the 1940s and 1950s.
Ken Charlton joined the Royal Australian Air Force and served with mixed British, Canadian and Australian crews in the RAF 58 Squadron, primarily at Stornoway in Scotland where the squadron formed part of Coastal Command.

Ken Charlton played for Canterbury-Bankstown between 1946 and 1954 and was captain in 1951-2 and 1954. He was awarded the Australian Sports Medal in 2000. His son,  Phil,  also played for Canterbury throughout the 1970s.

References

1923 births
Australian rugby league players
2012 deaths
Recipients of the Australian Sports Medal
Canterbury-Bankstown Bulldogs players
Rugby league players from Sydney